The following highways are numbered 13A:

Canada
 Alberta Highway 13A

United States
 County Road 13A (St. Johns County, Florida)
 Nebraska Spur 13A
 County Route 13A (Monmouth County, New Jersey)
 New York State Route 13A
 County Route 13A (Allegany County, New York)
 County Route 13A (Greene County, New York)
 County Route 13A (Suffolk County, New York)
 Secondary State Highway 13A (Washington) (former)